The 1952 Ole Miss Rebels football team represented the University of Mississippi during the 1952 college football season. The Rebels were led by sixth-year head coach Johnny Vaught and played their home games at Hemingway Stadium in Oxford, Mississippi. Ole Miss finished the regular season undefeated and on a six-game winning streak, including a victory over reigning Sugar Bowl champion and previously undefeated Maryland. They were third in the Southeastern Conference, with a record of 8–0–2 (4–0–2 SEC), and ranked 7th in the AP Poll. The Rebels were invited to their first ever Sugar Bowl, where they lost to SEC champion Georgia Tech.

Schedule

Roster
C Ed Beatty
OL Kline Gilbert
QB Jimmy Lear
FB Harol Lofton
DB Jimmy Patton
DE Jim Mask
WR Bud Slay
DB James Kelly

References

Ole Miss
Ole Miss Rebels football seasons
Ole Miss Rebels football